This is a list of national trees, most official, but some unofficial.

National trees

See also
 National emblem
 Floral emblem
 List of U.S. State and territory trees

References

N
Trees